Georgia Zouganeli (born 5 March 1966) is a Greek sprinter. She competed in the women's 4 × 100 metres relay at the 1988 Summer Olympics.

References

External links
 

1966 births
Living people
Athletes (track and field) at the 1988 Summer Olympics
Greek female sprinters
Olympic athletes of Greece
Olympic female sprinters